Hay-scented fern is a common name for several plants and may refer to:

Dennstaedtia, several species in the genus, especially:
Dennstaedtia punctilobula, native to eastern North America
Dryopteris aemula, native to western Europe